Insider is a Philippine television documentary and investigative television program, hosted by the news anchors of News5. It aired every Thursdays at 11:30pm-12:00 midnight (PST) between February 2 to August 2, 2012, on TV5. Its Producer's Cut airs every Friday at 7:30-8:30 PM (PST) on AksyonTV.

List of Insider episodes

See also
List of programs aired by TV5 (Philippine TV network)
List of programs aired by AksyonTV/5 Plus

References

2012 Philippine television series debuts
2012 Philippine television series endings
News5 shows
Philippine documentary television series
TV5 (Philippine TV network) original programming
AksyonTV original programming
Filipino-language television shows